Eudonia sudetica is a species of moth in the family Crambidae described by Philipp Christoph Zeller in 1839.

Etymology
The species name sudetica means from Sudetes.

Distribution
This species can be found in most of Europe, except Ireland, Great Britain, the Benelux, Portugal and most of the Balkan Peninsula.

Description
Eudonia sudetica has a wingspan of 17–21 mm. The forewings are whitish with brown markings.

Biology
The larvae live from October to May feeding on moss on rocks or trees.

Bibliography
 Zeller, P. C. (1839): Versuch einer naturgemäßen Eintheilung der Schaben. — Isis von Oken 1839 (3): 167-220. Leipzig

References

External links
 Lepiforum.de 
 Euroleps
 Paolo Mazzei, Daniel Morel, Raniero Panfili Moths and Butterflies of Europe and North Africa

Moths described in 1839
Eudonia
Moths of Europe